The Habsburgwarte is a 27 metre-tall tower that stands on Hermannskogel hill in Vienna. It was built by architect Franz von Neumann to resemble a medieval tower.

The construction of the Habsburgwarte was funded by the Österreichische Touristenklub (Austrian Tourist Club) to mark the Emperor Franz Joseph I’s 40th jubilee in 1888. It was completed in 1889.

In 1972, the tower was listed. Today, it is used as a lookout. On weekends in summer, the Austrian Tourist Club opens the tower to members of the public for an entrance fee.

In 1892, the Militärgeographisches Institut (Army Geographic Institute) of Austria-Hungary specified the Habsburgwarte as kilometre zero. A plaque on the viewing platform records this fact.

The Habsburgwarte was damaged during World War II. The Energieversorgung Niederösterreich (a provider of electricity, gas and heating in Lower Austria) assisted in the restoration of the tower, in return for which it may make use of the Habsburgwarte as a radio tower.

References
 DEHIO Wien – X. bis XIX. und XXI. bis XXIII. Bezirk, Anton Schroll & Co, Wien, 1996,

External links
 Habsburg-Warte - Informationen des ÖTK 

Buildings and structures in Döbling
Tourist attractions in Vienna
Towers in Vienna
Communication towers in Austria
Buildings and structures completed in 1889
Round towers